The Woman with the Fan' is a 1904 novel by the British writer Robert Hichens.

Adaptation
In 1921 it was adapted into a silent film The Woman with the Fan directed by René Plaissetty for Stoll Pictures.

References

Bibliography
 Goble, Alan. The Complete Index to Literary Sources in Film. Walter de Gruyter, 1999.
 Vinson, James. Twentieth-Century Romance and Gothic Writers. Macmillan, 1982.

1904 British novels
Novels by Robert Hichens
British novels adapted into films